Kwame Donte Vaughn (born May 31, 1990) is an American professional basketball player for BC Astana of the Kazakhstan Basketball Championship and the VTB United League. He is a 1.91 m (6'3") tall point guard-shooting guard. He finished his college basketball career at Cal State Fullerton.

High school
Vaughn attended Skyline High School, in Oakland, California, where he played high school basketball.

College career
Vaughn played NCAA Division I college basketball at the University of San Francisco, with the San Francisco Dons, from 2008 to 2010. He then played college basketball at Cal State Fullerton, with the Cal State Fullerton Titans, from 2011 to 2013.

Professional career
On August 26, 2013, Vaughn signed with Italian Serie A2 club Fortitudo Agrigento for the 2013–14 season. For the 2014–15 season he moved to the Israeli Liga Leumit club Ironi Ramat Gan.

On August 5, 2015, Vaughn signed with Belgian club Antwerp Giants. On April 12, 2016, Antwerp has terminated the deal with Vaughn for disciplinary reasons. Three days later, he signed with Israeli club Ironi Nahariya for the rest of the season.

In July 2016, Vaughn joined the Philadelphia 76ers' summer league squad, for the 2016 NBA Summer League. On July 13, 2016, Vaughn signed with ASVEL Basket of the French LNB Pro A. On October 14, 2016, he moved to the German club Skyliners Frankfurt for the rest of the season.

On September 4, 2017, Vaughn signed a one-year deal with Greek club Aris Thessaloniki. In late November 2017, he was released by Aris. On January 14, 2018, he signed with Serbian club Partizan for the rest of the 2017–18 season.
On November 18, 2018, he signed with Croatian club Zadar for the rest of the 2018–19 season. In March 2019, he left Zadar.

In 2021, Vaughn joined CSU Ploiești of the Romanian league, but left the team in November after averaging 15.3 points, 4.0 rebounds, and 3.3 assists per game. On January 11, 2022, Vaughn signed with Maccabi Haifa from the Israeli Basketball National League.

On November 19, 2022, he signed with BC Astana of the Kazakhstan Basketball Championship and the VTB United League.

References

External links
FIBA Europe Profile
Eurobasket.com Profile
Greek Basket League Profile 
Cal State Fullerton Titans College Bio

1990 births
Living people
ABA League players
American expatriate basketball people in Belgium
American expatriate basketball people in Croatia
American expatriate basketball people in France
American expatriate basketball people in Germany
American expatriate basketball people in Greece
American expatriate basketball people in Israel
American expatriate basketball people in Italy
American expatriate basketball people in Romania
American expatriate basketball people in Saudi Arabia
American expatriate basketball people in Serbia
American men's basketball players
Antwerp Giants players
Aris B.C. players
ASVEL Basket players
Basketball League of Serbia players
Basketball players from Oakland, California
Cal State Fullerton Titans men's basketball players
Fortitudo Agrigento players
Ironi Nahariya players
Ironi Ramat Gan players
KK Partizan players
KK Zadar players
Point guards
San Francisco Dons men's basketball players
Shooting guards
Skyliners Frankfurt players